Snaketown is a populated place situated in Pinal County, Arizona, United States. An Indian village, it is located on the Gila River Indian Community. In the O'odham language, ska-kaik means "many rattlesnakes", and it is from this term that the village derives its name. Snaketown is the location of the archeological site of the same name.

References

Populated places in Pinal County, Arizona
Gila River Indian Community